Quilen is a commune in the Pas-de-Calais department in the Hauts-de-France region of France.

Geography
Quilen lies 10 miles (16 km) northeast of Montreuil-sur-Mer on the D129E1 road. There's a pond on the village square.

Population

Places of interest
 The eighteenth-century château (private).
 The church of St.Pierre, dating from the seventeenth century.

See also
 Communes of the Pas-de-Calais department

References

Communes of Pas-de-Calais